Dargaz-e Palaki (also Romanized as Dargāz-e Palakī; also known as Dargāz) is a village in Gowharan Rural District, Gowharan District, Bashagard County, Hormozgan Province, Iran. At the 2006 census, its population was 101, in 27 families.

References 

Populated places in Bashagard County